Matthew John Entz (born October 9, 1972) is an American football coach. He is the head football coach at North Dakota State University. Entz took over from the departing Chris Klieman after Klieman led the 2018 North Dakota State Bison football team to the program's seventh NCAA Division I Football Championship in eight seasons. Entz was the defensive coordinator for the Bison from 2014 until his promotion following the 2018 season.

Personal life 
Entz is married to Brenda Entz. They have two sons: Kellen and Konner. Entz is a Christian.

Entz earned a bachelor's degree in biology from Wartburg College in 1995 and a master's degree in education and exercise science from Wayne State College in Wayne, Nebraska in 1998.

Head coaching record

References

External links
 North Dakota State profile

1972 births
Living people
Illinois College Blueboys football coaches
North Dakota State Bison football coaches
Northern Iowa Panthers football coaches
Wayne State Wildcats football coaches
Western Illinois Leathernecks football coaches
Winona State Warriors football coaches
Wartburg College alumni
Wartburg Knights football players
Wayne State College alumni
Sportspeople from Waterloo, Iowa
Coaches of American football from Iowa